Norma Ronald (1 March  1937, Northumberland, UK – 20 November 1993, Clara Vale, Ryton, Tyne and Wear, UK) was a British actress known for her appearances as Mildred Murfin in the 1960s BBC radio comedy series The Men from the Ministry, as Miss Ealand, Commander Straker's secretary in the science fiction television series UFO and as Sir John Wilder's ever-resourceful secretary Kay Lingard in both The Plane Makers and its follow-up The Power Game (1963–69)

She made an uncredited appearance in the 1969 Gerry Anderson film Doppelgänger (also known as Journey to the Far Side of the Sun). She appeared in The Frankie Howerd Show on 2 November 1975, and later in Tony's, a 1979/1981 BBC radio comedy with Victor Spinetti, set in an Italian hairdressers.

In 1966, she married fellow actor Edward Judd, with whom she had two daughters.

Filmography

References

External links
 

1937 births
1993 deaths
English television actresses
English radio actresses
20th-century English actresses
Actors from Northumberland